Lucien Bia (2 December 1852 - August 30, 1892) was a Belgian soldier and explorer of the Congo.

Bia was born in Liège, and after a tumultuous adolescence enrolled in the Army in 1870 for the Franco-German wars. He set out for the Congo Free State on March 15, 1887, in service with the Compagnie du Katanga. In 1892, after several expeditions across the Congo, he was promoted to Commandant de caravane, and served as lead guide for geologist Jules Cornet into Katanga to study mineral deposits in the regions of Likasi (Jadotville) and Kambove. Bia died in the Congo after an illness, and was buried near the Ditakata hills.

Selected works
 Katanga. Le Katanga avant les Belges et l'expédition Bia-Francqui-Cornet, by René J. Cornet, Lucien Bia, Jules Cornet, and Émile Francqui.

References
 "Lucien Bia", Biographie Coloniale Belge
 "Lucien Bia", Regiment Premier Guides

Belgian explorers
Explorers of Africa
Congo Free State officials
Military personnel from Liège
1852 births
1892 deaths